Clyde Martin Harvey (born November 9, 1948 in Port of Spain) is a Trinidadian clergyman and bishop for the Roman Catholic Diocese of Saint George's in Grenada. He was ordained in 1976. He was appointed bishop in 2017.

References

Trinidad and Tobago Roman Catholic bishops
People from Port of Spain
Living people
1948 births
Roman Catholic bishops of Saint George's in Grenada
21st-century Trinidad and Tobago people